Daming Temple is a temple located at the middle peak of Shugang Mountain, Yangzhou, Jiangsu, China. This temple is known for a famous monk, Jianzhen, who studied the sutras and initiated people into monkhood here in 742 AD before he left for Japan.

History
Daming Temple is so named because it was constructed during the periods in the reign of Xiaowu Emperor of the Liu Song dynasty during the period of Daming (453–464 AD). In the first year of Renshou in the Sui Dynasty (601), Emperor Yang Jian issued an edict to build 30 pagodas across the country for the worship of Buddhist relics (佛骨) to celebrate his birthday. So the Qi Ling Tower was build in this temple. The magnificent tower had nine floors and was known as "China's most magnificent and special architecture", so the temple was also called "Qi Ling Temple".

During the periods of the Wuzong reign of the Tang dynasty (618–907), it was called Qiling Temple.

In the Qing dynasty (1644–1911), due to social taboo of "Daming" (Daming Chinese:  means Ming dynasty), its name was changed into "Qiling Temple". In 1765, during the 30th year of Qianlong period (1736–1795), Qianlong Emperor honored the name "Fajing Temple".

In 1922, Japanese scholar Tokiwa Daijo built a pavilion, a gallery and a memorial hall before Daming Temple to commemorate master Jianzhen.

In 1973, Jianzhen Memorial Hall, designed by Liang Sicheng, was constructed.

In 1980, the temple reverted to its former name of "Daming Temple".

Architecture

The temple was constructed around the hill, which consisted of three parts. The central part consistes of the Hall of the "Four Heavenly Kings" ("Fēng Tiáo Diàn") and the Great Hall. The eastern part consisted of Pingyuan Hall and the "Jianzhen Memorial Hall". The western part consisted of Pingshan Hall, Si Garden and other features. The palaces and pavilions are well integrated with each other and well-arranged in structure.

Memorial Hall
The Memorial Hall modeled the style of the Main Hall in the Tōshōdai-ji which was organized and built by Jianzhen in Japan. A wood carving sitting statue of Jianzhen which was dry-lacquered and wrapped with linen layer by layer is enshrined in the hall.

Pingshan Hall
The Pingshan Hall was built by Song dynasty scholar Ouyang Xiu in 1048 during the Qingli period when he was prefecture chief of Yangzhou. When people overlook the distant scenes, the mountains are at the same level with sight line, hence the name "Pingshan Hall" (Ping means the same level and shan means mountains).

Qiling Pagoda
Some time during the Renshou reign of the Sui Dynasty - between 601 and 604 AD, the nine-story "Qiling Pagoda" was completed.

See also
Report on Water for Brewing Tea

References

Bibliography

External links

Buddhist temples in Yangzhou
Major National Historical and Cultural Sites in Jiangsu